Kathleen Beeler is an American cinematographer, best known for her work with Trinh T. Minh-ha and Lynn Hershman Leeson. She got her start working with Mike B. Anderson on Alone in the T-Shirt Zone, which she co-wrote, produced, was production designer, and acted in. She also shot Anderson's Kamillions and has done special effects photography for numerous higher-profile films. Beeler, along with Trinh T. Minh-ha, won the Excellence in Cinematography Award at the 1992 Sundance Film Festival for her work on the documentary [[Trinh T. Minh-ha#Shoot for the Contents (102 mins, 1991)|Shoot for the Contents]].

FilmographyStar Worms II: Attack of the Pleasure Pods (1985) (cinematographer)Alone in the T-Shirt Zone (1986) (cinematographer)Morgan's Cake (1988) (cinematographer)Kamillions (1989) (cinematographer)Surname Viet Given Name Nam (1989) (cinematographer)Shoot for the Contents (1992) (cinematographer)Virtual Love (1993) (cinematographer)The Hanged Man (1993) (cinematographer)Seduction of a Cyborg (1994) (cinematographer)Double Cross Click Click (1995) (cinematographer)A Tale of Love (1995) (cinematographer)Conceiving Ada'' (1997) (second unit camera operator)

References

External links
 

Year of birth missing (living people)
Living people
American cinematographers
American women screenwriters
American screenwriters
American production designers
American film producers
American film actresses
Special effects people
American women cinematographers
American women film producers
Women production designers
21st-century American women